Red Deer was a federal electoral district in Alberta, Canada, that was represented in the House of Commons of Canada  from 1908 to 2015.

History
This riding was created in 1907 from Calgary and Strathcona ridings.  At the time this was a vast riding taking in much of Central Alberta between the two major cities of Calgary and Edmonton.  The only major urban centre was Red Deer, then a small town of only 1,500 people.

Once an overwhelmingly rural constituency, it has been consistently reduced in geographic size over the years due to Red Deer's continued growth.  In 2003, about 20% of the district was transferred to the Wetaskiwin riding.

The riding was represented by centre-right MPs from 1935 onward.  Like most other Alberta ridings outside Calgary and Edmonton, the major right-wing party of the day usually won here by blowout margins. A centre-left candidate last cleared 20 percent of the vote in 1968, and from 1979 onward centre-left candidates were usually lucky to get 15 percent of the vote.

The riding was split almost in half for the 2015 election.  The southern portion, including downtown, became Red Deer—Mountain View, while the northern portion was merged with Wetaskiwin to form Red Deer—Lacombe.

Members of Parliament

This riding elected the following Members of Parliament:

Current Member of Parliament
Its Member of Parliament is Earl Dreeshen, a farmer and a teacher. He was first elected in 2008. He is a member of the Conservative Party of Canada.

Election results

Note: Conservative vote is compared to the total of Progressive Conservative and Canadian Alliance vote in 2000.

Note: Canadian Alliance vote is compared to the Reform vote in 1997.

Note: NDP vote is compared to CCF vote in 1958 election.

Note: Progressive Conservative vote is compared to "National Government" vote in 1940 election.

Note: "National Government" vote is compared to Conservative vote in 1935 election.

Note: Conservative vote is compared to Unionist vote in 1917 election.

Note: Unionist vote is compared to Liberal-Conservative vote in 1911 election.

See also
 List of Canadian federal electoral districts
 Past Canadian electoral districts

References

Notes

External links
 
 Expenditures - 2008
 Expenditures - 2004
 Expenditures - 2000
 Expenditures - 1997
 Elections Canada
 Website of the Parliament of Canada

Former federal electoral districts of Alberta
Politics of Red Deer, Alberta
1908 establishments in Alberta